The National Club Football Association (NCFA) is an association of collegiate American football teams. It is a member of CollClubSports and manages the NCFA National Championship.

NCFA teams are typically operated by student sports clubs rather than faculty, and do not formally form part of a school's intercollegiate athletic program. The clubs can be based at any post-secondary college or university provided the institution in question agrees to officially recognize football as a club sport. In contrast the Intercollegiate Club Football Federation (ICFF) recognizes, in addition to the above, student clubs without official sponsorship and independent programs that combine students at multiple schools that would otherwise be unable to play college football (the NCFA allows its members to play such independent teams but does not allow those teams to contest for the championship). A number of clubs have membership in both the ICFF and NCFA, especially in the midwest and south (only in the Northeast, where the ICFF's Yankee conference expelled several NCFA member teams in 2015, is there a major distinction between the two).

From 2012 through 2015, the NCFA National Championship Game was held at Salem Football Stadium in Salem, Virginia, which has also been the site of the NCAA Division III Football Championship. From 2016 through 2019, the NCFA National Championship Game was held at West Family Stadium on the campus of West Liberty University in Wheeling, West Virginia.

The 2020 Fall season was cancelled due to the COVID-19 pandemic.

Active Member Schools

Of the 20 active member schools for the 2022 season, seven (Michigan State, Ohio State, South Carolina, Sacred Heart, Miami of Ohio, Pittsburgh, Toledo) have parent NCAA programs. The remaining 13 teams operate as their schools' only active football programs, despite not being sponsored by their respective athletic departments.

NCFA National Championship
The NCFA National Championship Bowl is the final game of the National Club Football Association season, pitting the semi-finalists of the NCFA Playoffs against one another. From 2012 to 2014, the game featured the top-two teams in the country as determined by the NCFA Coaches Poll and Power Rankings. Starting in 2015, the NCFA instituted an eight-team playoff, which featured four conference championship games. Those four winners would determine the semifinalists before the championship was played.

The 2019 NCFA National Championship Bowl Game between The Ohio State University and Oakland University featured the first simulcast of the event, with the game being broadcast live on both video and radio outlets. The Buckeyes won the game, 36–9, over the Golden Grizzlies. 

Following the canceled 2020 season, the 2021 NCFA National Championship Bowl Game featured the top two teams in the league's final Power Rankings rather than a playoff due to lingering financial effects felt by the COVID-19 pandemic. In addition, the location of the game was moved to Waynesburg University, a more centralized location for the remaining teams in the league. 

Beginning in 2022, the NCFA reinstated the playoff system after realigning the league into three conferences. For the 2022 season, three conference champions and one at-large team will be eligible for a four-team playoff. The at-large team will be the highest ranked non-conference champion in the final NCFA Power Rankings.

Yearly Postseason Awards
Starting in 2013, the National Club Football Association began awarding First, Second and Academic All-Americans. Starting in 2014, the league began naming award winners for Players of the Year on both sides of the football as well as the Head Coach of the Year. Oakland University leads all schools with five postseason honors while George Mason has accumulated four.

References

External links
 

American football leagues in the United States
College club sports associations in the United States